Phillip Omondi (1957 – 21 April 1999) was a Ugandan football player and manager.

Playing career
A forward, Omondi played for local side Kampala City Council FC from 1973 to 1979, when he moved to the United Arab Emirates to join Sharjah.

Omondi played for the Uganda national team at the 1974, 1976 and 1978 African Cup of Nations, where he was the leading goal-scorer as Uganda finished second. He also helped the team to the 1973 and 1977 CECAFA Cup titles.

Career as a manager
Following his playing career, Omondi became a manager of Bank of Uganda FC and KCC before retiring in 1992.

References

1957 births
1999 deaths
Ugandan footballers
Association football forwards
Uganda international footballers
1974 African Cup of Nations players
1976 African Cup of Nations players
1978 African Cup of Nations players
Kampala Capital City Authority FC players
Sharjah FC players
Ugandan expatriate footballers
Ugandan expatriate sportspeople in the United Arab Emirates
Expatriate footballers in the United Arab Emirates
Ugandan football managers